Anchiale buruense is a medium-sized stick insect found in Buru of the Maluku Islands, Indonesia.

Description
Anchiale buruense are geenish-brown. Both sexes have a pair of wings.

References

External links
Phasmatodea.com: Anchiale buruense "Buru"

Phasmatodea
Insects described in 2015